Trent Dabbs is an American singer-songwriter who was raised in Jackson, Mississippi and is based in Nashville for his professional career. As a solo artist, Dabbs has released eleven albums, including his latest album, Positano, as well as a self-titled collaboration album with Ashley Monroe since his move to Nashville. His songs have been played in several TV shows, including Grey's Anatomy, Private Practice, One Tree Hill, Vampire Diaries, Pretty Little Liars, Parenthood, American Idol, So You Think You Can Dance, and commercials for Crate & Barrel and Zales. He also co-produced and co-wrote many of the songs from Pure Country: Pure Heart.

Career
In addition to Dabbs' career as a singer, he has also co-written several songs with other artists. Trent's songwriting credits include Ingrid Michaelson's Top 40 single, "Girls Chase Boys" released in February 2014, Kacey Musgraves' single, "High Horse" released in March 2018 and Coin's single "Growing Pains" released in 2018. He has written several songs that have been on ABC's Nashville including the songs "Undermine" and "Don't Put Dirt On My Grave Just Yet" that were both recorded by Hayden Panettiere and "Shine" that was recorded and released by Sam Palladio

Dabbs is also a co-founder of the musical collective Ten Out of Tenn, founded in 2005. In 2015, the collective celebrated its tenth anniversary, and sold out the Ryman Auditorium. In 2012, Trent released the debut album for his band, Sugar & The Hi Lows. He and his bandmate, solo artist, Amy Stroup also released a Holiday album, Snow Angel, in November 2012. The duo released its second album, High Roller in June 2015.

Credits 
Credits adapted from AllMusic.

Discography
Quite Often (2004)
What's Golden Above Ground (2006)
Ashley Monroe and Trent Dabbs (2007)
Decade Fades (2008)
Your Side Now (2010) (Produced by Thomas Doeve)
Transition (2010) (Produced by Thomas Doeve)
Southerner (2011) (Produced by Jeremy Bose)
Future Like Snow (2012)
The Way We Look at Horses (2013)
Believer (2015)
The Optimist (2016)
Positano (2018)
Ojai / Be Where You Are (2023)

TV placements

Alias
 This Time Tomorrow

Bones
 Keep Me Young

Grey's Anatomy
 Your Side Now

Ghost Whisperer
 Inside These Lines

Nashville
 Don't Put Dirt on My Grave Just Yet
 Acting The Part
 Ammunition
 Undermine
 Shine

One Tree Hill
 Until You Won Me Over
 Inside These Lines
 Odds Of Being Alone
 Look Back On
 Same Way Twice
 This Time Tomorrow
 Take It All In
 Follow Suit
 Off We Go

Hawaii Five-0
 Leave To See

Life Unexpected
 Odds Of Being Alone

World Of Jenks
 Odds Of Being Alone

The Chase
 Call It What It Is

The Vampire Diaries
 Counting Sleep
 Last Kiss
 Means to an End
 Losing Ground
 Wrap My Mind Around You

The Mountain
 Yesterdays Apology

The OC
 Love Goes

October Road
 It's Not Like That
 What's Golden Above Ground

The Hills
 What's Golden Above Ground

Pretty Little Liars
 Better Off Now
 Counting Sleep
 Stay By Me
 Follow Suit
 Turn Our Eyes Away
 This Time Tomorrow
 Where Fear Runs Through

Private Practice
 This Time Tomorrow

So You Think You Can Dance
 Inside These Lines

Parenthood
 Odds of Being Alone

Flashpoint 
 Come To Life

NCIS
 Better Off Now

Drop Dead Diva
 I'm Not OK (cover version)

The Arrow
Vertigo

Mistresses
 I'm not OK

Music videos

References

 Biography 
 Ten Out of Tenn
 Trent Dabbs – Official website

External links
TrentDabbs.com – Official website
Biography  – By Trent Dabbs

Year of birth missing (living people)
Living people
American male singer-songwriters
Singer-songwriters from Mississippi
Singers from Nashville, Tennessee
Musicians from Jackson, Mississippi
Singer-songwriters from Tennessee